Atanasije I was the Archbishop of Peć and Serbian Patriarch, head of the Serbian Orthodox Church from 1711 until 1712.

Before he became Serbian Patriarch, Atanasije served as Metropolitan of Skopje, from 1706, under Serbian Patriarch Kalinik I. That was a very prominent position, so when old patriarch died in 1710, Atanasije was elected as his successor in 1711. His seat was in the Patriarchal Monastery of Peć.

As new Serbian Patriarch, he strengthened ties with newly created Metropolitanate of Krušedol, an autonomous ecclesiastical province of Serbian Patriarchate of Peć in Habsburg monarchy. His rule was not long, since he died on 23 April 1712.

References

Sources

External links
 Official site of the Serbian Orthodox Church: Serbian Archbishops and Patriarchs

Atanasije I
Serbian Orthodox metropolitans of Skopje
Eastern Orthodox Christians from Serbia
18th-century Eastern Orthodox archbishops
18th-century Serbian people
Serbs from the Ottoman Empire